From the Lions Mouth [sic] is the second studio album by English post-punk band The Sound, released in November 1981 on record label Korova. Following the release of their previous album Jeopardy, keyboardist Belinda "Bi" Marshall left the group and was replaced by Colvin "Max" Mayers. For their new album, The Sound worked with producer Hugh Jones, as well as co-producing the album themselves. The album's sound was more polished than previous efforts.

Like Jeopardy, From the Lions Mouth was critically acclaimed but failed to capture the attention of the public, with the band's fanbase limited to a cult following. One single, "Sense of Purpose (What Are We Going to Do)", was released.

Content 
The album cover artwork was taken from the 1872 painting Daniel in the Lion's Den by Briton Rivière.

NME compared the album's bleak nature to Joy Division's Closer. Despite The Sound being posited as a gloomy band, AllMusic wrote, "snake-charming opener 'Winning' is like a dash of cold water in the faces of all the bands that were wallowing and withering away at the weeping well [...] The Sound were not mopes. They had their problems with life, but rather than just vent or escape from them, they confront them and ask questions and attempt to sort it all out."

Release 
One single, "Sense of Purpose (What Are We Going to Do)", was released in promotion for the album, on 20 September 1981. From the Lions Mouth was released in November by record label Korova.

The album was remastered and re-released in 2002 by Renascent, a record label formed specifically for the task of reissuing The Sound's records. This release included the 1982 single "Hothouse", despite frontman Adrian Borland's wishes that the album should have the same track listing as the original. The song was not included as a separate track, but as a continuation of "New Dark Age".

Reception 

From the Lions Mouth was well received by critics upon its release. Mike Nicholls of Record Mirror wrote, "The Sound seem set to take up where Joy Division left off and become the saviors of the adolescent grim brigade." Melody Maker's Steve Sutherland commented on the album's lighter, more commercial tone than that of Jeopardy, calling it "Jeopardy-as-palatable-product." NME critic Andy Gill noted themes of "individualism and collectivism" in the album's songs, which he said "are infused with a certainty of individuality and apartness – and all that that entails – but well aware of the need for coming-together in an era which has seen apartness emphasized to lethal levels."

In its retrospective article "Unspun Heroes", NME praised the album as "underrated" and a "ferocious, vital document." Uncut described it as "a monumental work of rock 'n' roll angst" and The Sound's greatest album, while Trouser Press cited it as the group's best work. Jack Rabid of The Big Takeover commented that the album "established the foursome as a formidable band for the ages."

Borland described From the Lions Mouth as "the most polished and probably our most commercial album, with some of the greatest songs".

Track listing

Personnel 
 The Sound

 Adrian Borland – vocals, guitar, production
 Michael Dudley – drums, percussion, production
 Graham Green – bass guitar, production
 Max Mayers – keyboards, production

 Technical

 Hugh Jones – production, engineering
 Briton Rivière – album cover artwork
 Howard Hughes – album cover concept
 Julian Mendelsohn – engineering
 Simon Fowler – sleeve liner photo photography

References

External links 
 

1981 albums
The Sound (band) albums
Albums produced by Hugh Jones (producer)
Gothic rock albums by English artists
Albums recorded at Rockfield Studios